is a 1977 Japanese tokusatsu live action television show featuring Japan's own version of  American superhero Superman. It was the third in the Baron series, following Red Baron in 1973 and Mach Baron in 1974.

Synopsis
Teru Tendou is a young reporter for the Shonen Times. In times of trouble, he could transform into Ganbaron and save the day. The plot revolved mostly around Teru keeping his identity a secret from his friends.

The opening narration was "Look!  Up in the sky!  It's a bird!  It's a plane!  No, it's Ganbaron!  Faster than a Shinkansen!  Stronger than Kaiju!" 

Similar to Tetsujin 28-go and Giant Robo, Ganbaron could call a giant robot named Daibaron ("big baron"). Unlike those two however, Daibaron was a combining robot similar to Getter Robo or Golion/Voltron.

The show was sponsored by Bullmark which advertised toys based on the show, such as the "Zincron Deluxe Daibaron".

External links
 

Superhero television shows
1977 Japanese television series debuts
1977 Japanese television series endings
Tokusatsu television series
Nippon TV original programming